Paul Rossignol was the second superintendent of the Dahlonega Mint. He became superintendent in 1841 and remained in the position until 1843.

References

People from Georgia (U.S. state)
1840s in the United States